Clifton "Cliff" Chadwick (26 January 1914 – 8 March 1999) was an footballer who scored 45 goals from 174 appearances in the Football League playing as a winger for Oldham Athletic, Middlesbrough, Hull City and Darlington in the 1930s and 1940s. He went on to be player-manager of Stockton.

References

1914 births
1999 deaths
Footballers from Bolton
English footballers
Association football wingers
Fleetwood Town F.C. players
Oldham Athletic A.F.C. players
Middlesbrough F.C. players
Hull City A.F.C. players
Darlington F.C. players
Stockton F.C. players
Rochdale A.F.C. wartime guest players
English Football League players
English football managers